Cat-Man may refer to:

 Cat-Man (Marvel Comics), the name of a couple of different characters in the Marvel Universe
 Cat-Man and Kitten, a pair of Golden Age superheroes
 Catman (comics), an enemy of Batman
 Cat-Man, a pseudonym for the superhero El Gato Negro
 A character in Perfect Hair Forever

See also 

 Catman (disambiguation)
 Catwoman, a DC Comics character
 Cat (comics), a number of comics characters of the same name
 Stalking Cat, also known as Cat Man